is a Japanese ski mountaineer and ultramarathon runner. She lives in Tokyo.

Selected results (ski mountaineering)  
 2007:
 2nd, Asian Championship, Tsugaike Kōgen Ski Resort, Nagano, Japan
 2009:
 1st, Asian Championship, relay (mixed teams of 1 woman & 3 men), Beidahu, Jilin, China
 2nd, Asian Championship, individual
 2nd, Asian Championship, vertical race
 2010:
 10th, World Championship, relay, together with Itō Mayumi and Horibe Michiko
 1st, Asia Cup
 1st, Gangwon Provincial Governor's Cup, Yongpyong Ski Resort/Balwangsan
 1st, Tsugaike (Japan championship & Asia Cup 2nd race), individual, Nagano Prefecture
 2011:
 10th, World Championship, relay, together with Catrin Thomas and Horibe Michiko

References

External links 
 Mase Chigaya at SkiMountaineering.org
 Ultra Marathon Statistics at DUV

1967 births
Living people
Japanese female ski mountaineers
Japanese ultramarathon runners
Japanese female long-distance runners
Female ultramarathon runners
21st-century Japanese women